Beripara Cove is the 2.45 km wide cove indenting for 1.8 km the southeast coast of Liège Island in the Palmer Archipelago, Antarctica.  It is entered north of Balija Point and south of Leshko Point.

The cove is named after the ancient Thracian settlement of Beripara in Northern Bulgaria.

Location
British mapping in 1978.

Maps
 British Antarctic Territory.  Scale 1:200000 topographic map.  DOS 610 Series, Sheet W 64 60.  Directorate of Overseas Surveys, UK, 1978.
 Antarctic Digital Database (ADD). Scale 1:250000 topographic map of Antarctica. Scientific Committee on Antarctic Research (SCAR). Since 1993, regularly upgraded and updated.

References
 Bulgarian Antarctic Gazetteer. Antarctic Place-names Commission. (details in Bulgarian, basic data in English)
 Beripara Cove. SCAR Composite Antarctic Gazetteer.

External links
 Beripara Cove. Copernix satellite image

Coves of Graham Land
Bulgaria and the Antarctic
Liège Island